Angelika Mertens (11 October 1952 – 19 June 2019) was a German politician. She was parliamentary state secretary at the Federal Ministry of Transport, Building and Urban Affairs from 2000 until 2005.

Life 

Mertens was born in 1952 in Harsefeld. She was a bookseller and studied economics. In 1969 she joined the Social Democratic Party of Germany (SPD) and was a member of the Young Socialists.

Mertens held a municipal council position in Eimsbüttel from 1987 – 1994. She was the SPD parliamentary group's spokesperson on transport and building policy from 1998, and then became parliamentary state secretary in the transport ministry during the first and second Schröder cabinet.

After leaving parliament, she was chairwoman of the Arbeiter-Samariter-Bund in Hamburg from 2006 until her unexpected death in June 2019.

References 

1952 births
2019 deaths
People from Stade (district)
Members of the Bundestag for Hamburg
Members of the Bundestag 2002–2005
Members of the Bundestag 1998–2002
Members of the Bundestag 1994–1998
Female members of the Bundestag
People from Eimsbüttel
Members of the Bundestag for the Social Democratic Party of Germany
20th-century German women
21st-century German women politicians